The Iller-Lech Plateau, also known as the Upper Swabian Plateau (Oberschwäbische Hochebene), is one of the natural regions of Germany.

Boundaries 
In the northwest the Iller-Lech Plateau borders on the Swabian Jura (unit D60 on the map) and, in the extreme northeast, on the Franconian Jura (unit D61 on the map). The boundary with these two natural regions is roughly formed by the course of the river Danube.

In the east the Iller-Lech Plateau borders on the Lower Bavarian Upland and Isar-Inn Gravel Plateaus (unit D65 on the map).  North of Augsburg its eastern boundary runs roughly parallel to state road 2035 (Augsburg-Pöttmes-Neuburg an der Donau), south of Augsburg east of the Lech, roughly between Mering, Geltendorf and Schongau.

To the south the Southern Alpine Foreland (D66 on the map) borders on the Iller-Lech Plateau. The boundary between these two natural regions is partly formed  by the terminal moraines of the Würm glaciation.

Sub-divisions 
The sub-divisions are based upon the natural regions of Germany as shown on the BfN's Landscapes in Germany map. In the following table these sub-divisions are described from west to east. For the exact location and boundaries of the individual sub-divisions: see the BfN's map Landscapes in Germany (http://www.bfn.de/geoinfo/landscapes/ )

Sub-divisions in Baden-Württemberg

Sub-divisions in both Baden-Württemberg and Bavaria

Sub-divisions in Bavaria

See also 
 Natural regions of Germany

Sources 

 Natural regions of Germany
 Bavarian Alpine Foreland 
 Riedel
 Bayernviewer at the Bavarian Measurement Office: http://www.geodaten.bayern.de/BayernViewer/index.cgi  
 Map of the BfN's Landscapes in Germany: http://www.bfn.de/geoinfo/landscapes/  and the information pages of the individual sub-divisions of the Iller-Lech Plateau

References 

 
Swabia
Geography of Bavaria
Regions of Baden-Württemberg
Natural regions of Germany